The 1927 German football championship, the 20th edition of the competition, was won by 1. FC Nürnberg, defeating Hertha BSC 2–0 in the final.

For 1. FC Nürnberg it was the fifth national championship. It brought to an end Nuremberg's most successful era where the club won five titles in eight seasons, missing out on a sixth one in the inconclusive 1922 championship. Nuremberg would have to wait nine seasons, until 1936, to win its sixth of eight titles in the German championship era from 1903 to 1963. For Hertha BSC it marked the second consecutive final loss, a series the club would extend to four in the following seasons. Hertha would than go on to win back-to-back championships in 1930 and 1931 for a record six consecutive final appearances.

SpVgg Fürth's Andreas Franz was the top scorer of the 1927 championship with six goals.

Sixteen club qualified for the knock-out competition, two from each of the regional federations plus an additional third club from the South and West. In all cases the regional champions and runners-up qualified. In the West the third spot went to the third placed team of the championship while, in the South, the third spot was determined in a separate qualifying competition for runners-up and third placed teams.

Qualified teams
The teams qualified through the regional championships:

Competition

Round of 16
The round of 16, played on 8 May 1927:

|}

Quarter-finals
The quarter-finals, played on 22 May 1927:

|}

Semi-finals
The semi-finals, played on 29 May 1927:

|}

Final
The final, played on 12 June 1927:

|}

References

Sources
 kicker Allmanach 1990, by kicker, page 160 to 178 – German championship

External links
 German Championship 1926–27 at weltfussball.de 
 German Championship 1927 at RSSSF

1
German
German football championship seasons